The 2012 MercedesCup was a men's tennis tournament played on outdoor clay courts. It was the 35th edition of the Stuttgart Open, and was part of the ATP World Tour 250 series of the 2012 ATP World Tour. It was held at the Tennis Club Weissenhof in Stuttgart, Germany, from 7 July until 15 July 2012. First-seeded Janko Tipsarević won the singles title.

Singles main draw entrants

Seeds

 1 Seedings are based on the rankings of June 25, 2012

Other entrants
The following players received wildcards into the singles main draw:
  Dustin Brown
  Tommy Haas
  Robert Kern

The following players received entry from the qualifying draw:
  Igor Andreev
  Pavol Červenák
  Martin Fischer
  Julian Reister

Withdrawals
  Julien Benneteau
  Philipp Petzschner

Doubles main draw entrants

Seeds

 Rankings are as of June 25, 2012

Other entrants
The following pairs received wildcards into the doubles main draw:
  Martin Emmrich /  Björn Phau
  Robin Kern /  Jan-Lennard Struff

Finals

Singles

 Janko Tipsarević defeated  Juan Mónaco, 6–4, 5–7, 6–3

Doubles

  Jérémy Chardy /   Łukasz Kubot defeated  Michal Mertiňák /  André Sá 6–1, 6–3

References

External links
 Official website 
 ATP tournament profile

Stuttgart Open
Stuttgart Open
Stutt